In heraldry and vexillology, a Spanish fess is a term occasionally used to describe the central horizontal stripe of a tricolour or triband flag that is twice the width of the stripes on either side of it.

The name is based on the most well-known example of this style of flag, the flag of Spain, and in analogy to the equivalent term for vertically striped flags, the Canadian pale.

Looser definition
As with the Canadian pale, a looser definition of Spanish fess also exists, in which the central stripe is considerably larger than, but not necessarily twice the width of the two outer stripes.

Other flags featuring a Spanish fess include the national flags of Lebanon, Cambodia, Laos and Tajikistan, the restored flag of Libya, the flag of French Polynesia, the flag of Prussia, and the proposed national flag of Cyprus. Had the flag of Israel lacked the top and bottom white bands, it too would have featured a Spanish fess.

Flag gallery

1:2:1 proportions

Other proportions

See also
 The flag of Colombia, with a ratio of 2:1:1, instead of 1:2:1
 The flag of Ecuador, with a ratio of 2:1:1, instead of 1:2:1
 The bisexual pride flag, with a ratio of 2:1:2, instead of 1:2:1
 Canadian pale

Flags by design
Heraldic ordinaries